Shandong cuisine, more commonly known in Chinese as Lu cuisine, is one of the Eight Culinary Traditions of Chinese cuisine and one of the Four Great Traditions. It is derived from the native cooking style of Shandong Province, a northern coastal province of China.

Features
Shandong cuisine is famous for its wide selection of material and use of different cooking methods. The raw materials are mainly domestic animals and birds, seafood and vegetables. The masterly cooking techniques include bao (爆; quick frying), liu (溜; quick frying with corn flour), pa (扒; stewing), kao (烤; roasting), zhu (煮; boiling), and using sugar to make fruit and crystallising with honey.

Styles
Shandong cuisine is divided into two sub-regional styles: Jinan and Jiaodong. Shandong cuisine is known for its light aroma, freshness and rich taste. It puts emphasis on two types of broths, light and milky. Both broths are seasoned with scallions and go well with the freshness of seafood.

 Jiaodong style, encompassing dishes from eastern Shandong: Fushan (a district of Yantai), Qingdao, Yantai and the surrounding regions. It is characterised by seafood dishes with a light taste.
 Jinan style, made up of dishes from Jinan, Dezhou, Tai'an and the surrounding regions. One of its features is the use of soup.

Influence
Although less available in overseas Chinese restaurants (usually operated by migrants from southern China), Shandong cuisine is considered one of the most influential schools in Chinese cuisine; most of the country's culinary styles have developed from it. Modern cuisines in North China (Beijing, Tianjin and the northeastern regions) are branches of Shandong cuisine, and meals in most Northern Chinese households are typically prepared using simplified Shandong methods.

During the Spring and Autumn period (770-221 BCE), Shandong was a territory of the Qi and Lu states. Both states, with mountains and fertile plains, were economically and culturally developed and had abundant aquatic products, grains and sea salt. Some of the earliest known descriptions of Chinese culinary methods come from the states. Yi Ya, a retainer of Duke Huan of Qi, was renowned for his culinary skill. Confucius (who was born in the Lu state) was quoted in the Analects as saying, "One should not indulge overly in fine flour, or in kuai (a dish akin to carpaccio) that is sliced too thinly". About food, he recommended: "Do not consume food which looks spoiled, smells spoiled, is out of season, is improperly butchered, or is not made with its proper seasoning"; this indicated a level of refinement in food preparation in Shandong at the time.

The cuisine as it is known today was created during the Yuan dynasty. It gradually spread to northern and northeastern China, Beijing and Tianjin, where it influenced Imperial cuisine. Shandong cuisine is primarily made up of eastern Shandong and Jinan dishes.

Ingredients
Although modern transportation has increased the availability of ingredients China, Shandong cuisine remains rooted in tradition. It is noted for its variety of seafood, including scallop, prawn/shrimp, clam, sea cucumber and squid.

Maize
In addition to seafood, Shandong is unique for its use of maize, a local cash crop not widely cultivated in northern China. Unlike the sweet corn of North America, Shandong maize is chewy, starchy and often has a grassy aroma. It is served as steamed (or boiled) cobs, or the kernels are removed from the cob and lightly fried.

Peanuts
Shandong is noted for its peanuts, which are fragrant and naturally sweet. Large dishes of peanuts (roasted in the shell or shelled and stir-fried with salt) are common at meals, and they are served raw in a number of cold dishes from the region.

Grains
Shandong uses a variety of small grains. Millet, wheat, oats and barley can be found in the local diet, often eaten as congee or milled and cooked into a variety of steamed and fried breads. People in Shandong tend to prefer steamed breads rather than rice as a staple food.

Staple vegetables
Despite its agricultural output, Shandong has not traditionally used the variety of vegetables seen in southern Chinese cooking. Potatoes, tomatoes, cabbages, mushrooms, onions, garlic and eggplant are staple vegetables, with grassy greens, sea grasses and bell peppers also common. The large, sweet cabbages grown in central Shandong are known for their delicate flavour and hardiness; a staple of the winter diet in much of the province, they appear in many dishes.

Vinegar
Shandong's greatest contribution to Chinese cuisine is arguably its vinegar. Hundreds of years of experience and unique local methods have led to the region's prominence in Chinese vinegar production. Unlike the lighter, sharper types of vinegar popular in the south, Shandong vinegar has a complexity which some consider fine enough to stand alone.

Subgroups of Shandong cuisine
 Jinan cuisine: The cooking methods of Jinan cuisine focus on quick frying, roasting and boiling. Jinan-style food is generally sweet, aromatic, fresh and tender. A famous dish from Jinan is stir-fried large yellow croaker with sugar and vinegar.
 Jiaodong cuisine: Jiaodong cuisine focuses more on cooking and cutting skills. The Jiaodong area is located close to the sea, so most raw materials are seafood. Sea cucumber, abalone and scallop are common in this area. A famous Jiaodong dish is stir-fried sea cucumber with green onions.
 Kongfu cuisine: "Kongfu" refers to the descendants of Kong Qiu (Confucius). The Kong family have high standards for the quality of every dish. This is why all Kongfu dishes are beautifully designed and prepared with excellent cutting skills.
 Luxinan cuisine: "Luxinan" refers to southwestern Shandong Province. People living in this area like to eat healthy food with Chinese medicines and raw materials.

See also
 Dezhou braised chicken
 List of Chinese dishes

References

 
Regional cuisines of China